Dipankar Bhattacharjee (born 1 February 1972) is a Badminton player from Assam, India. He represented India at many International tournaments including Barcelona and Atlanta Olympics.
He was the Indian National Badminton Champion thrice and a runner-up twice.
At Barcelona Olympics, he reached the pre-quarters.

Early life
Dipankar started playing badminton at a very early age. He was five years old when his father Mr. Iswar Bhattacharjee took him out for Badminton training. His father is his first coach and has been a constant guide and adviser who started local tournaments in the Guwahati Indoor Hall (Kanaklata Indoor Stadium) to attract interests from younger kids and their parents for Badminton.

In addition to his own father, Dipankar was trained by several other good coaches. He had spent few years at Prakash Padukone's Badminton academy at Bangalore and trained with Prakash, Vimal Kumar, Mr. Veedu, etc. He was guided by National and State level Badminton coaches.

Career
Dipankar had been the star attraction in many tournaments. His style of game attracts spectators naturally. He always played fast-paced, endurance and offense (smash) based game which always energized onlookers. He was praised many a times especially by
Mr. Prakash Padukone as India's one of a kind player who had the potential of taking on the champions from other Asian countries like China and Indonesia, and who could match their level of speed, endurance, and reflex.

Retirement
He retired early from the game in 2004 due to injuries, after playing the last Indian National Championships at Guwahati.

Post playing career
He launched his Badminton Coaching center at Guwahati by the name of
"Iswarati Center for Badminton Learning" or ICBL. The project was carried on for almost 3 years in a badminton coaching facility in Guwahati.He is also a  mentor of Indian Collegiate Athletic Program for the sport of Badminton.

Achievements
 Sub-junior National runner-up - Guwahati in 1980
 Junior National Champion - Madras (Chennai) in 1987
 Senior National Champion - Three times
 Senior National runner-up - Two times
 Represented India in Barcelona (1992) and Atlanta Olympics (1996). He lost in the pre-quarters to Zhao Jianhua, of China, 15–4, 15–12.
 Had been nominated for Arjuna Award couple of times

Hall of Fame
Dipankar's achievements have gone into the record books in the following areas -
 He is the first Olympian from the current state of Assam.
 He is one of the first Badminton players to represent India in Olympics. 
 He is the only Senior National Badminton Champion from the North-East India till date (2014).
 He is the only Male Shuttler from India to have made it to Two Olympics (1992 & 1996).

Personal life
Dipankar is currently employed with Indian Oil Corporation, Western regional office in Mumbai. He married Ms. Dahlia Banerjee of Kolkata in 2001 and has a son with her.

He is an MBA graduate from India's leading B- school, S.P.Jain Institute of Management and Research, Mumbai.

Dipankar underwent successful brain surgery for Pituitary adenoma, a type of brain tumor on Feb 4, 2020 at the Hinduja Hospital in Mumbai, performed by noted neurosurgeon B. K. Misra.

References

External links
 

Indian male badminton players
Olympic badminton players of India
Badminton players at the 1996 Summer Olympics
Badminton players at the 1992 Summer Olympics
Indian national badminton champions
Racket sportspeople from Guwahati
1972 births
Living people